Vernon Albert Small (born 18 July 1954, England) is a New Zealand chess International Master (IM). He represented New Zealand in eight Chess Olympiads from 1976 to 1992. Previously a journalist for Fairfax Media, Small is now a press secretary to Cabinet minister David Parker.

Biography
Small moved to New Zealand at the age of 9 in 1964 from England. Small was educated at Shirley Boys' High School in Christchurch, New Zealand. He was awarded a PhD in English Literature from the University of Canterbury (New Zealand) in 1985. His doctoral thesis was titled The authorial persona: A truth conditional account. He has previously worked as National Affairs Editor for Fairfax Media New Zealand, based in the Parliamentary Press Gallery; for which he has received numerous awards. Since the formation of the Sixth Labour Government after the 2017 New Zealand general election, he has worked as press secretary to Cabinet minister David Parker.

He lives in Wellington, New Zealand.

Chess career

He represented New Zealand in eight Chess Olympiads from 1976 to 1992, playing on board 1 in 1982, 1984 and 1988. His best result was his Olympiad debut at the 22nd Chess Olympiad, Haifa 1976, when he scored 7/9, and finished equal third with Grandmaster Larry Evans for the bronze medal on board 3.

Small won or jointly won the New Zealand Chess Championship on four occasions; 1979/80 (shared with Ortvin Sarapu and Ewen Green), 1980/81 (shared with Ortvin Sarapu and Roger Nokes), 1981/82, and 1984/85.

He has defeated a number of strong players, including Jonathan Mestel, Eugenio Torre and Oscar Panno.

Notable games
 Vernon Small vs Oscar Panno, Olympiad 1988, French Defense: Tarrasch Variation, (C03), 1-0

References

External links 
 

Chess International Masters
New Zealand chess players
Chess Olympiad competitors
1954 births
Living people
New Zealand journalists
People educated at Shirley Boys' High School
English emigrants to New Zealand